Bottles are able to be recycled and this is generally a positive option. Bottles are collected via kerbside collection or returned using a bottle deposit system. Currently just over half of plastic bottles are recycled globally. About 1 million plastic bottles are bought around the world every minute and only about 50% are recycled.

Glass bottles
There are a large number of benefits to recycling glass bottles, not only for the manufacturing of new bottles but also for the production of other materials that can be used in different contexts. Clean glass bottles are 100% recyclable, can be substituted for up to 95% of raw material, and can be recycled ad-infinitum without the loss of purity or quality. Recycled glass also has a variety of uses outside of the production of new bottles. The least beneficial of these uses is when glass bottles are sifted, crushed down, and mixed with food refuse to create dirty mixed cullet. Mixed cullet has few uses outside of being used as and alternative to traditional landfill daily cover. Alternatively, smaller and unrecoverable pieces of glass are ground down into a fine powder and used as a high grade sand alternative for the production of concrete. 

Recoverable glass is often sorted by colour as different colour glass has a variety of uses and values. In the United States, recovered green glass is primarily shipped to Europe to produce wine bottles, brown glass is sold domestically to beer bottlers, and clear glass, the most valuable of the three can be used to replace up to 30 percent of virgin material in the production of new glass. In recent years, extended producer responsibility (has come to the forefront of the debate concerning glass bottle recycling due to glass being very easy to clean and reuse, and its innate cradle to cradle design properties. Recycled glass is a necessity, as without it, manufacturers would not be able to keep up with the demand for new glass containers. 

Recycling one glass bottle can save enough energy to power a computer for 25 minutes. In fact for every 10% of cullet added to the production of a new bottle, energy usage goes down by 3-4%. Recycling one ton of glass can save approximately 42 kWh of energy which translates to 7.5 pounds of air pollutants not being released into the atmosphere.

PET bottles

PET bottles are mostly recycled as a raw material. In many countries, PET plastics are coded with the resin identification code number "1" inside the universal recycling symbol, usually located on the bottom of the container.

HDPE bottles
HDPE is commonly used in bottles, particularly bottles (or jugs) of milk.  Recycling code 2 is applicable.  In the US, only about 30-35% of HDPE bottles are recycled.

Legislation
Container deposit legislation are laws passed by city, state, provincial, or national governments.  They require a deposit on bottles to be collected when sold and reimbursed when returned.

In May 2018 the Israeli Ministry Impose EUR 12 m Fine on Bottle Manufacturers and Importers that Didn't Meet Collection Targets.

Environmental comparisons

Many potential  factors are involved in environmental comparisons of returnable vs non-returnable systems.  Researchers have often used life cycle analysis methodologies to balance the many diverse considerations.  Often the comparisons show benefits and problems with all alternatives.   It helps provide an objective view of a complex subject.

Reuse of bottles requires a reverse logistics system, cleaning and, sanitizing bottles, and an effective Quality Management System.  A key factor with glass milk bottles is the number of cycles of uses to be expected.  Breakage, contamination,  or other loss reduces the benefits of returnables. A key factor with one-way recyclables is the recycling rate:  In the US, only about 30-35% of HDPE bottles are recycled.

See also
Plastic recycling
Glass container industry
Reverse vending machine
Glass crusher
Oregon Bottle Bill
History of bottle recycling in the United States

References

המשרד להגנת הסביבה

External links
Container Recycling Institute
 EcoARK

Recycling by product
Bottles
Energy conservation